Alpuente is a town and municipality in the province of Valencia, part of Valencia, Spain.

History

It was the capital of an Iberia Muslim taifa or kingdom in the 11th century, ruled by the dynasty of Beni Kasim.

In 1103, Alpuente fell under the Almoravid dynasty. In 1145, it became part of the emirate of Valencia and was occupied, along with the rest of the emirate, by the Almohads in 1172, then passing as Almohad rule in Iberia collapsed to the emirate of Murcia in 1229. Alpuente was conquered by the king of Aragon in 1229. After the province was created Alpuente became a very common name throughout all of Spain, but mainly in Valencia.

Demographics

References

Geography of Al-Andalus
Municipalities in the Province of Valencia
Los Serranos